The Müller AO Classification of fractures is a system for classifying bone fractures initially published in 1987 by the AO Foundation as a method of categorizing injuries according to therognosis of the patient's anatomical and functional outcome. "AO" is an initialism for the German "Arbeitsgemeinschaft für Osteosynthesefragen", the predecessor of the AO Foundation.

It is one of the few complete fracture classification systems to remain in use today after validation.

Comprehensive classification of the long bones

The English language version of the system allows consistent in detail description of a fracture in defined terminology by creating a 5-element alphanumeric code:

Localisation

First, each fracture is given 2 numbers to describe which bone it affects, and where in the bone:

Type

Each fracture is next given a letter (A, B or C) to describe the joint involvement of the fracture:

The exceptions to this step include:

Groups & Subgroups

Finally, the fracture is given 2 further numbers to denote the fracture pattern and geometry.

For segment 2 (diaphyseal) fractures:

For segment 1 and 3 (epiphyseal and metaphyseal) fractures:

Subgroups are then used to describe the fractures in terms of displacement (versus apposition, which is the degree to which the parts are in contact with each other), rotation, angulation and shortening.

AO pediatric comprehensive classification of long bone fractures

A pediatric version of the long-bone classification was published in 2006 to further classify fractures of immature bone and so the effects on future growth:

OTA/AO Classification unifying extension

The Orthopaedic Trauma Association Committee for Coding and Classification initially published their classification system covering the whole skeleton in 1996.  In 2006 they published a revision, unifying the Muller/AO and OTA systems into a single alphanumeric classification, which has been further updated in 2018:

References

External links
 AO Surgery Reference

Orthopedic classifications
Skeletal disorders